Johannes "Hannes" Evert Koivunen (August 24, 1911, Helsinki – September 29, 1990) was a Finnish boxer who competed in the 1936 Summer Olympics.

He was born and died in Helsinki.

In 1936 he was eliminated in the quarterfinals of the light heavyweight class after losing his fight to the upcoming silver medalist Richard Vogt.

External links
 

1911 births
1990 deaths
Sportspeople from Helsinki
Light-heavyweight boxers
Olympic boxers of Finland
Boxers at the 1936 Summer Olympics
Finnish male boxers